Tony Saunders is an American bass player and synthesizer player in the genres of jazz, gospel, R&B, pop and world music. He is a composer, arranger, music producer, and head of his own studio.

Biography
Saunders comes from a musical family. His world-famous keyboardist father, Merl Saunders, got him started at an early age. He began singing at the age of five and played piano from age eight. Herbie Hancock and Sly Stone were among Saunders’ early teachers. Stone gave Saunders an organ at the age of ten. At age fourteen he began playing the bass. While growing up there were always great musicians around his father and his cousin Eddie Moore, Jimmy Smith, Stanley Turrentine, Sonny Rollins, Dewey Redmen, George Duke, Al Jarreau, Bole Sete, John Handy were all there for Saunders to Listen to.

In 1969, Tony's father, Merl Saunders, was the Musical Director for the Joseph Dolan Tuotti musical Big Time Buck White (which featured Muhammad Ali in the NY Off-Broadway production with music and lyrics by Oscar Brown Jr. During that time, Saunders was the lead singer for The Man Child Singers.
The Man Child Singers performed and recorded the songs Right On and Mighty Whitey from that play on a 45 produced by his father's label Summertone Records.  The Manchild Singers also recorded a San Francisco Giants jingle.

Saunders received one of his first piano lessons from Herbie Hancock. Saunders was awarded a fellowship at the prestigious San Francisco Conservatory of Music for piano. His first Fender bass guitar was a gift from Tom Fogerty, brother of John Fogerty and rhythm guitarist for Creedence Clearwater Revival. He graduated from the Conservatory of Music in San Francisco. He received an Emmy at 14 years old with his father for the children's special Soul Is, a PBS documentary featuring Black poetry accompanied by Saunders on the bass. The second Emmy was for an Episode of Digital Journey Titled "China The Digital Economy"

At age 17 he began playing with his father and Jerry Garcia and was a featured musician in Merl Saunders & Aunt Monk.  Later Saunders played in the original Rainforest Band, and recorded on all other projects of his father. Legendary bassists Chuck Rainey, Jack Casady and John Kahn all took interest in Saunders’s ability. John Kahn turned Saunders on to James Jamerson, and Saunders modeled his playing around all of his teachers. Other influences include Stanley Clarke, Alphonso Johnson, Rufus Reid, Ralphe Armstrong, and current favorite Marcus Miller. This has led to a flexible and diverse style. Anthony Davis and Lee Miles were the bass players who made Saunders leave the piano behind.

Saunders has scored movies, corporate videos, TV shows, and commercials, and produced many CDs, primarily out of his studio, Studio 1281. He wrote the music to the stage play Zetta, performed in San Francisco by the American Conservatory Theater, and also assumed the role of musical director for the show. He was the musical director of Rock Justice, written by Bob Heyman and Marty Balin of Jefferson Starship. Artists collaborating with him on projects have included Nils, Jeff Lorber, Paul Brown, Gail Jhonson, Jeff Ryan, Marion Meadows, Mavis Staples, John Lee Hooker and Austin "Auggie" Brown, the nephew of Michael Jackson. (Auggie's project was sold to Midas Records.) Saunders was first hired as a staff producer for San Francisco Records having previously worked for the Label President Ron Umile when he was at Associated Booking in NY. Umile hire Saunders to work with Martha Reeves, Randy Crawford, and others. Saunders's first solo album, Bigger than Outside, was released in October 2011. It remained on the charts for 70 weeks. His second CD Appaloosa, was released on January 22, 2014.  It features Grammy winners Howard Hewett, Bill Champlin and Tony Lindsay on vocals. That CD has seven instrumentals and six vocal songs.  Tom Politzer from Tower of Power, Rock Hendricks from Paul Hardcastle's jazz master series also grace the CD with their saxophone playing. Longtime friends of Saunders, Fred Ross and Sakai, background singer with Train, also sing on the duet "The Question Is". The third CD for San Francisco Records was called Uptown Jazz. It featured Gabrial Mark Hasselbach, Rock Hendricks, Sakai, Paul Harcastle Jr., and Gerald Albright. Saunders latest single "Rock Steady" is a cover of the Whispers' 1980s hit. This hit was produced in Atlanta by The Legendary Whispers Producer/Bassist/Vocalist: 
Magic Mendez. Harmony Blackwell, The Whispers programmer/background vocalist and Magic did the vocals with Magic laying all the music tracks himself. Nils and Saunders played the lead lines to the song the was written by Babyface. This chart-topping song reached #1 on many stations throughout the world. His new album, Sexy Somethin'  was slated to be released on February 21, 2020, on San Francisco Records. It features Jeff Lorber, Marion Meadows, Paul Brown, Nils, Gail Jhonson, Jeff Ryan, Ray Chew, and Paul Jackson Jr.

Saunders has been influenced by gospel music since he was a young child. He studied under choir director Leon Patillo. Saunders met the Hawkins family when he was 14, and credits them with not only inspiring him to play bass but also with giving spiritual guidance to his life. He played with Walter Hawkins, Edwin Hawkins and the Love Center Choir in the 80's, and released He Lifted Me Up, his first gospel project, in 2005. Among the other Gospel artists Saunders has played with are Andrae Crouch, the Clark Sisters, the late Reverend James Moore, Daryl Coley, James Cleveland and the Williams Brothers, The Mighty Clouds Of Joy and Shirley Ceaser. He completed a gospel project that featured Derrick Hughes, Alfreda Lyons-Campbell, and Saunders' longtime friend, gospel bassist/drummer Joel Smith (Walter and Ed's nephew).

Saunders has also had the pleasure of playing with his father with Jerry Garcia, Buffy St Marie, David Crosby, Stephen Stills, David Soul, Max Gail jr. Stevie Wonder, Bob Weir, Bill Kruetzman, Brent Myland, Vince Welnick, John Cippolina, Paul Butterfield, Nick Gravinites and Sly Stone.

Saunders has worked with and performed on behalf of several charitable and social issue-oriented organizations including Bread And Roses, the Seva Foundation, the Rex Foundation, Rock for Hope, the Haight-Ashbury Free Clinic, and the Rainforest Action Network.

Bands and people Saunders has played with include Tony Saunders Romancing The Bass, The Rainforest Band, Les McCann, George Howard, Ellis-Liebman Band, Ringo, Esther Phillips, Chaka Kahn, Harvey Mason, Eric Clapton, Joe Louis Walker, Keystone Revisited, Merl Saunders & the Rainforest Band, Band of Gypsies with Buddy Miles, Mitch Mitchell, Randy Hansen, Zero, Robert Winters & Fall, David Crosby, Tony Saunders & Paradize, and M.R.L.S. A re-launch of the Rainforest Band as a tribute to Merl Saunders took place at the 29th Starwood Festival on July 25, 2009, the site of their last performance, featuring Tony Saunders, guitarist Michael Hinton, and other members of the Merl Saunders Rainforest Band and other Saunders’ projects. Also appearing were Sikiru Adepoju on talking drum and Douglas "Val" Serrant on steel drum and djembe.
In 2021 Tony Signed to a new label Baja/TSR Records and his career has continued to climb to another level.  His new CD All About Love is his best effort yet. People cannot get enough of hearing it. here is a link to Tony's Spotify page where you can listen to his music https://open.spotify.com/artist/5OLFOdnwdWsZry0VUo3b2Q

Awards and honors
Saunders won a 2022 Telly Award for the video Black Lives Matter which he co authored with Nona Brown. Saunders has also received two Emmy Awards. He also won the New York Film Festival's Grand and Silver Award for educational compositions.

Discography

Studio albums
 Whispering Waters - Tony Saunders/Paradize (2002) Bass, Arranger, Producer, Bass (Upright), Six-string Bass, Five-string Bass
 Romancing The Bass - Tony Saunders solo CD  (2011)
 Appaloosa - Tony Saunders solo CD (2014)
 Uptown Jazz - Tony Saunders solo CD (2016)
 Sexy Somethin'   Tony Saunders solo CD (2020
    All About Love  Tony Saunders  solo cd (2021)

As major contributor
 Peace to the Planet  - Rain Forest Band (2005) Bass, Composer 
 He Lifted Me Up - Tony Saunders & Anointed Voices(2005) 
Sweet Breeze   The Noteworthy Band  2021  Bassist, composer, producer

Other contributions

 Right On / Mighty Whitey - The Man Child Singers (1969) Summertone (45 RPM)
 Merl Saunders - Merl Saunders (1974) Fantasy
 You Can Keep Your Hat On - Merl Saunders (1976) Bass
 Light'n Up, Please! - David Liebman (1976) Bass
 Come to Me - Juice Newton	(1977) Bass
 Rock Justice - Marty Balin (1979) EMI (Cast Recording - Music Director)
 Imagine Heaven - Edwin Hawkins Singers (1982) Clavinet, Bass
 Death or Glory - Combat 84 (1984) (Liner notes only)
 Do the Right Thing [Soundtrack] (1988) (Mixing / engineer)
 Chain - Family Stand (1990) (Mixing only)
 Funk Drumming - Jim Payne (1993)
 Brothers & Sisters I Will Be Praying for You - Rev. James Moore (1994) Bass
 Beyond The Thunder - Neal Schon (1995)
 Best Kept Secret - Lady Bianca (1995) Bass
 Red Blooded Blues - Various Artists (1995) Percussion
 Blues of the Month Club - Joe Louis Walker (1995) Bass
 Blue Gold - Various Artists	(1996) Bass
 Keepers - Merl Saunders (1997) Bass
 Takoma Eclectic Sampler - Various Artists (1997) Bass
 Every Woman's Blues: The Best of New Generation - Various Artists (1998) Bass
 Fiesta Amazonica - Merl Saunders and the Rainforest Band (1998) Bass
 Summertime in the Big City - Larry Vann (1998) Bass, Arranger, Producer, Engineer, Keyboard Programming
 Illegally Insane - Fifty One Fifty (1999)
 Blues Routes: Heroes & Tricksters - Various Artists (1999) Bass
 Yes I'm Ready - Ricardo Scales (1999) Bass
 Blues for a Rotten Afternoon - Various Artists (2000) Bass
 Rollin' - Lady Bianca (2001) Bass
 Final Recordings 1 - John Lee Hooker (2003) Organ & Bass
 Reason Why - Loni Williams (2003)	Engineer, Mixing
 Rhythm & Roots of Larry Vann - Larry Vann (2003)	Arranger, Guitar (Bass), Keyboards, Drum Programming, Keyboard Programming
 Sweet Jimmie Sings the Blues - Sweet Jimmie (2003) Bass
 Face to Face - John Lee Hooker (2004) Organ, Bass
 I Am Sorry - Rene (2004) Bass, Producer, Vocal Arrangement, Drum Programming, Mixing
 The Unsung Soldier - Tony Saunders (2004)
 Still Groovin' - Merl Saunders (2004) Bass|Keyboards|Fender Rhodes, Arranger|Producer|Mixing|Musician
 Jazz Ala Soul - M.R.L.S. (2004) Arranger|Engineer|Mixing, Bass
 Live! From San Francisco - R&B All-Stars (2004) Bass, Arranger, Producer, Engineer, Synthesizer Programming, Repair
 Songs for My Three Mothers - Juel Nero (2004) Vocals (background), Producer
 Songs for the Being Human - Steven B.'s Heart Language (2005) Bass, Arranger, Vocals, Vocals (background), Producer
 Back From the Dead - Automatic Pilot (2005) Guitar (Bass), Guest Appearance (Brown and McQueen Music)
 Sunlight of My People - Ayana (2005) Bass (Electric), Engineer, Mixing
 Sweet Love - Patricia Wilder (2005) Synthesizer, Bass, Arranger, Keyboards, Producer, Engineer, Executive Producer, Mixing
 In a Mendocino Town [Bonus Tracks] - II Big (2006) Guitar (Bass), Producer, Engineer, Mixing, Guest Appearance
 Face in the Glass - II Big (2007)	Bass, Producer, Engineer, Mixing, Guest Appearance
 Knee Deep - James Levi (2007) Bass, Keyboards, Producer, Engineer
 Home Schooled: The ABCs Of Kid Soul - Various (compilation) (2007) Numero Group
 Just Kita - Nikita Germaine (2008)
 Sweet Feelings - Ashling Cole (2008)
 Cyril Magnin Street Fair - Various Artists (2008)	Group Member
 Live at John's Grill - We 3 (2008) Bass, Producer, Executive Producer, Bass (Upright), 6-String Bass, 5-string Bass, Group Member
 Magic Touch - Ron Thompson and the Resistors (2008) Bass, Engineer, Mastering
 Paradise in the Valley - Hartfield Family	(2008) Synthesizer, Bass, Piano, Arranger, Producer, Engineer, Vocal Arrangement, Editing, Drum Programming, Mixing, Instrumentation
 St. Mark Baptist Church: 60th Anniversary - Pastor Rodney G. McNab SR./The Spiritual (2008) Guitar (Bass), Producer, Engineer, Executive Producer, Horn Arrangements, String Arrangements
    Romancing The Bass 2011    Tony Saunders   Producer, Engineer, Bassist composer
    Appaloosa   2014         Tony Saunders     Producer, Engineer, Bassist composer
    Uptown Jazz  2016      Tony Saunders       Producer, Engineer, Bassist composer
    Sexy Somethin  2020    Tony Saunders       Producer, Engineer, Bassist composer

Filmography
 Rock Justice - Marty Balin (1979) EMI (Music Director) (DVD released 2007)
 Peggy Sue Got Married - (1986) Actor (in "The Four-Mations"), musical performer, wrote one song
 CBS Schoolbreak Special: God, the Universe & Hot Fudge Sundaes (1986) actor: Balliff
 Farmer & Chase - (1995) Soundtrack
 Faith & Fear: The Children of Krishna (2001) Composer & Musician (TV)
 Beginning Bass - Tony Saunders DVD  (2005)
 Writer's Day (2005) Composer & Foley Artist
 Learning Bass Guitar - Tony Saunders & Rudy Sarzo - DVD (2007)

Bibliography
 Learning Bass Guitar - Tony Saunders & Rudy Sarzo - Book & DVD (2007)
 Beginning Bass - Tony Saunders - Book & DVD  (2005)
 Funk Drumming - Jim Payne (played on enclosed CD) Mel Bay Publications (April 1993) ,

References
 The Rolling Stone Encyclopedia of Rock & Roll by Rolling Stone Editors Holly George-Warren, Patricia Romanowski, Patricia Romanowski Bashe, and Jon Pareles (2001) p. 429
 Screen World 1998 by John Willis, Barry Monush (1999) p. 155
 Crosby, Stills & Nash: The Biography by Dave Zimmer, Henry Diltz, David Crosby (2008) p. 246
 Release Print: The Newsletter of the Film Arts Foundation (San Francisco, Calif.) (1993) p. 21

Notes

External links

 Tony Saunders homepage
 Tony Saunders MySpace Page

African-American guitarists
American funk bass guitarists
American soul guitarists
American male bass guitarists
Living people
Year of birth missing (living people)
Rainforest Band members
Place of death missing
21st-century African-American people